The 1986 Women's World Championship was a women's snooker tournament organised by the World Ladies Billiards and Snooker Association and held in Solihull from 9 to 12 October 1986. The event is recognised as the 1986 edition of the World Women's Snooker Championship first held in 1976. Allison Fisher defeated Sue LeMaich 5–0 in the final to win the title.

The only frame she lost during the tournament was in her 4–1 defeat of Angela Jones in the semi-final. Fisher retained her title with a 5–0 whitewash of Sue LeMaich in the final. Fisher's  of 84 against Lynette Horsburgh in the last 16 round was a new championship record and remained the highest of that year's competition.

Main Draw

References 

1986 in English sport
1986 in snooker
1986 in women's sport
International sports competitions hosted by England
World Women's Snooker Championship
Women's World Championship